Mananthavady State assembly constituency is one of the 140 state legislative assembly constituencies in Kerala state in southern India.  It is also one of the 7 state legislative assembly constituencies included in the Wayanad Lok Sabha constituency.
 As of the 2021 assembly elections, the current MLA is O. R. Kelu of CPI(M).

Mananthavady constituency came into existence in 2011. Before it was known as North Wynad from 1965 to 2011.

Local self governed segments
Mananthavady Niyamasabha constituency is composed of the following local self governed segments:

Members of Legislative Assembly
The following list contains all members of Kerala legislative assembly who have represented Mananthavady Niyama Sabha Constituency during the period of various assemblies:

Key

  

As North Wynad

As Mananthavady

Election Results 
Percentage change (±%) denotes the change in the number of votes from the immediate previous election.

Niyamasabha Election 2021

Niyamasabha Election 2016
There were 1,87,760 registered voters in Mananthavady Constituency for the 2016  Niyamasabha Election.

Niyamasabha Election 2011 
There were 1,67,097 registered voters in the constituency for the 2011 election.

See also
 Mananthavady
 Wayanad district
 List of constituencies of the Kerala Legislative Assembly
 2016 Kerala Legislative Assembly election

References 

Assembly constituencies of Kerala

State assembly constituencies in Wayanad district